Mechanical Suite is a 2001 Russian comedy-drama film directed by Dmitry Meskhiev.

The film is based on the story Brothers by Janusz Głowacki.

Plot
Kolya (Sergei Golovkin), an employee from the patent department of a plant, goes to Lykovo near St. Petersburg for the weekend and dies of a heart attack. The administration of the plant decides to transport the body to the homeland of the deceased for burial. For this purpose two people are sent on a business trip: Markerants (Sergei Garmash), who at any time can develop an ulcer, and business-minded Mityagin (Mikhail Porechenkov).

On the way, Mityagin offers Markerants to drink a toast in the dining car for Kolya, for destiny, for their country. All ends with Markerants giving all the money collected by the plant for Kolya's burial to some woman named Lyuyba (Evgeniya Dobrovolskaya).

Having lost their travel money, they go on an adventure and drive with the stiff in a normal train compartment. A chance passenger, Edouard (Konstantin Khabensky), who has stolen an item worth $50,000 from a factory, drops his immensely heavy suitcase on the dead man's head. Edouard ends up thinking that he is the culprit in Kolya's death. To get rid of the evidence, he throws the corpse out the window. The greedy Mityagin decides to take advantage of the situation and demands money so that he will not to give out the "murderer". This leads to everyone subsequently finding themselves under the persecution of the mafia and the police.

Cast
Mikhail Porechenkov as Mityagin
Sergei Garmash as Markerants
Konstantin Khabensky as Edouard
Sergei Makovetsky as operative officer Plyuganovskiy
Andrei Zibrov as machinist Viktor
Oksana Bazilevich as striptease dancer Asya
Aleksandr Bashirov as man in a police car
Zoya Buryak as beer seller
Irina Rozanova as Olga
Sergei Golovkin as deceased Kolya
Yevgenia Dobrovolskaya as Lyuba
Yury Kuznetsov as pathologist
Mikhail Wasserbaum as Olga's lover
Aleksandr Fatyushin as Major Lebedev
Zinaida Sharko as Plyuganovskiy's mother

Awards
Yevgenia Dobrovolskaya received the Best Supporting Actress prize at the Nika (2001), Golden Aries (2001)  and "Constellation" (2001) awards.

References

External links
 

Russian crime comedy-drama films
2001 black comedy films
2001 films
Films directed by Dmitry Meskhiev
2000s crime comedy-drama films
Russian black comedy films